Hyacinthoides paivae is a species of bluebell in the genus Hyacinthoides native to the north-western part of the Iberian Peninsula. It was formally described in 1996, having previously been identified as belonging to the related species H. italica.

Description
Hyacinthoides paivae is a perennial plant which grows from bulbs that are typically  × . H. paivae can be told apart from H. italica by its broader leaves and larger flowers; H. hispanica differs in having longer, narrower, unscented and bell-shaped flowers.

Distribution and ecology
Hyacinthoides paivae is endemic to the north-western part of the Iberian Peninsula, including western parts of Galicia (A Coruña, Ourense and Pontevedra provinces) and north-western parts of Portugal (Beira Litoral, Douro Litoral, Minho and Trás-os-Montes provinces). Material of an unidentified species from the Sierra de la Demanda, a small mountain range on the border between Burgos province and La Rioja, matches H. paivae genetically.

H. paivae occurs in oak woodland and pine woods growing over Ulex, Erica cinerea and Cistus spp., as well as other shady habitats. It also occurs occasionally on coastal cliffs, and in mown meadows. The typical flowering period is March and April, although it can be as late as June in upland areas, such as Monte Pindo.

Taxonomic history
In 1990, bluebells assigned to the species Hyacinthoides italica were reported from north-western Spain. Later analyses of the species morphology demonstrated that the plants did not belong to H. italica, which is only otherwise found near the French–Italian border. Instead, it was realised that they represented a new species, which was named Hyacinthoides paivae by Santiago Ortiz and Juan Rodríguez-Oubiña in 1996, the specific epithet  honouring the Portuguese botanist Jorge Paiva.

Ortiz and Rodríguez-Oubiña initially placed the species in "Hyacinthoides sect. Somera", but more recent molecular phylogenetic analysis could not confirm any of the existing sections in the genus, and placed it instead in an informal group alongside H. non-scripta, H. hispanica and H. cedretorum.

References

External links

paivae
Plants described in 1996
Flora of Spain
Flora of Portugal
Endemic flora of the Iberian Peninsula